The massacre of Vassy was the murder of Huguenot worshippers and citizens in an armed action by troops of Francis, Duke of Guise, in Wassy, France, on 1 March 1562. The massacre is identified as the first major event in the French Wars of Religion. The series of battles that followed concluded in the signing of the Peace of Amboise (or Pacification Treaty of Amboise) the next year, on 19 March 1563.

The events surrounding the massacre of Vassy were famously depicted in a series of forty engravings published in Geneva seven years later.

Background

Religious politics
Beginning in the reign of Francis I, Protestants who followed the teachings of John Calvin, known as Huguenots, faced state-backed persecution in France. This persecution continued under his two successors, Henry II and Francis II, the latter of whom died young in 1560. Catherine de' Medici, regent of Charles IX, proposed the Edict of January (or Edict of Saint-Germain) with the hopes that providing a measure of toleration to Calvinism would help France avoid further chaos of the kind that had engulfed the south-west of the country. Because the Parlement of Paris resisted registration of the edict until 6 March 1562, it was not in force at the time of the Duke's entry into Wassy.

Wassy and the Guise

Feudal overlords
The town of Wassy at the time of the massacre was home to a population of roughly 3000 and was a royal town. Despite being royal it possessed feudal ties to the House of Guise, having been the Dower of Mary, Queen of Scots, the Duke of Guise's niece. The Guise family also possessed part of the town in the form of the castle district overseen by the Captain Claude Tondeur, in which the Protestant meeting house where the massacre occurred was located. The region at large was the family's power base, with their princely title coming from the seat of Joinville which was located only a few miles away from Wassy. These connections would play a role in Guise's justification for his actions after the fact.

The growth of Protestantism
Despite its small size, the town saw strong Huguenot activity beginning early. In 1533 Antoinette of Bourbon, the Duke of Guise's mother who managed his estates, oversaw the burning of a man caught preaching in the town. Despite persecution, the community grew, aided by the sister church at Troyes with whom the town had many economic links. In 1561 the community held their first officiated service inside the town in the house of a draper, with an attendance of around 120. As the community continued to grow beyond 500, the pastor of Troyes, Gravelles, performed the town's first baptism on 13 December. The Christmas service was attended by 900, making the town a Huguenot stronghold, with a higher percentage of Huguenots there than in Troyes or any other town in the region. In January 1562, Gravelles departed the town to return to his home, with a dedicated preacher named Léonard Morel being sent out for the town from Calvin's base of Geneva.

Attempts at repression
This growth was not however uncontested. News of public preaching reached Guise in November, and he despatched several gendarmes to the area with the aim of snuffing out the heresy, with little success. The town Curé Claude le Sain voiced his concerns about the public preaching to Antoinette, however she was unwilling to take action without the support of the Duke and the region's provincial governor, Francis I, Duke of Nevers, who was a Protestant. In the wake of Gravelle's open baptism, Charles, Cardinal of Lorraine, the Duke of Guise's brother intervened, sending a delegation under his client the bishop Jerôme Bourgeois to bring the community back into the Catholic fold. His attempt to break up the Protestant service however ended in humiliation. He was chased out of the meeting house under insult, which only increased the size of the community by the time of their Christmas service.

Massacre

Prelude
In the opening months of 1562, France slipped increasingly close to civil war. Conscious of this and anxious to avoid a coalition of German princes in favour of the Huguenot Louis, Prince of Condé should war break out, the Duke of Guise met with Christoph, Duke of Württemberg promising to promote the confession of Augsburg in France in return for the Duke of Württemberg's neutrality. This achieved, Guise began the return to Paris to which he had been called on 28 February by the Lieutenant-General Antoine of Navarre to aid him in opposing Catherine's Edict of January. 

Stopping on the way at the family seat of Joinville, his mother Antoinette complained to him about the spread of heresy among their estates and urged him to act against it. Setting out from Joinville with 200 gendarmes the next day, Guise intended to stop next at his estates at Éclaron, passing by Wassy to pick up several reinforcement gendarmes that were mustering in the town. Reaching Brousseval a short distance away he heard the church bells of Wassy ringing, at a time in the day which precluded the possibility it was for Mass, enraging him. He summoned a council of his leading gentlemen to decide how to proceed, with the hardline faction of Jacque de la Montaigne and Jacque de la Brosse leading the council towards intervening in the town. On the pretext of desiring to hear mass in the town, Guise and his entire gendarme company entered Wassy by the South gate and headed for the church.

Massacre
Heading towards the church, Guise was further incensed to find that the location of the Protestant meeting house was both so close to the town church and in the Castle district which constituted his property. He entered the church, convening with the town's leading opponents of Protestantism, the priest and provost, who urged him to act and disperse the assembly. Heading out towards the meeting house he sent Gaston de la Brosse out ahead of him with two pages to announce his arrival. Inside the barn 500 worshippers sang psalms. Gaston attempted to gain entry to the barn but was resisted by those at the door; overpowering them he began to kill those nearest. The rest of Guise's company now rushed forward, trumpets blaring for the attack, with Guise himself either unwilling or unable to stop what had begun. Many worshippers fled through the hole in the roof, some others escaping were picked off by sharpshooters, those who fled down the streets were met by arquebusiers stationed at the cemetery. The pastor Morel was wounded and captured. After an hour the massacre ceased. Of the 500 parishioners, 50 lay dead, of whom 5 were women and 1 a child.

Aftermath

Word spreads
News of the massacre spread quickly both around France and internationally, with tracts printed and woodcuts made for the illiterate from England to the Holy Roman Empire. The exact nature of the events, in particular in relation to whether it had been a Huguenot or a member of Guise's party who had begun the violence at the door, immediately became a source of disagreement between Protestant and Catholic polemics and contemporary histories. 

In the Protestant Histoire des Martyres, it was presented as an act of pre-meditated violence on the part of the Catholic men who cried upon entering the temple, "let us kill them all". In Guise's recollections to Duke Christophe of Württemberg, which formed the basis for the Catholic account, he reported that upon trying to inspect the temple he was resisted, and arquebuses were fired from the inside at his men, who had only swords to defend themselves.

The word massacre, which had previously referred in French to the butcher's block and knife, entered the lexicon with a new meaning.

Further massacre and revolt
The massacre inspired further religious violence in its immediate wake. On 12 April, the people of Sens massacred over 100 of the town's Huguenots, throwing their corpses into the Seine. Further massacres occurred in Castelnaudary and Bar-sur-Seine in early 1562. 

Huguenots involved in the attempted or successful seizure of towns such as Rouen and Troyes asserted that their actions were necessary to prevent themselves being massacred like the parishioners of Wassy.

Spiral to war
Having committed the massacre, and despite resulting instructions from Catherine to immediately come to court, Guise continued on to Paris, where the Catholic population, upon hearing the news of his actions, gave him a hero's welcome. Catherine, as regent, seeing the dangerous potential of the magnates in the city, ordered him and the leader of the Huguenot party, the Prince of Condé to vacate Paris, Guise however refused to do so. In response to this and the massacre Condé marched on Orléans seizing it on 2 April and several days later releasing a manifesto which in justifying his rebellion cited the "cruel and horrible carnage wrought at Vassy, in the presence of M. de Guise". Several days later at the Calvinist Synod of Orleans he was proclaimed the protector of all Calvinist churches in the Kingdom.

First French war of religion
The major engagements of the war occurred at the Siege of Rouen, the Battle of Dreux and the Siege of Orléans. At the Siege of Rouen (May–October 1562), the crown regained the city, but Antoine of Navarre died of his wounds. In the Battle of Dreux (December 1562), Condé was captured by the crown and Anne de Montmorency, the governor general, was captured by the rebels. In February 1563, at the Siege of Orléans, Guise was shot and killed by the Huguenot Jean de Poltrot de Méré. As he was killed outside of direct combat, the Guise family considered this an assassination on the orders of the duke's enemy, Admiral Gaspard II de Coligny. The popular unrest caused by the assassination, coupled with the resistance by the city of Orléans to the siege, led Catherine de' Medici to mediate a truce, resulting in the Edict of Amboise on 19 March 1563.

In fiction
The massacre is depicted in Ken Follett's 2017 novel A Column of Fire.

See also
Massacre of Sens
List of massacres in France
St. Bartholomew's Day Massacre

References

External links
Virtual Museum of Protestantism: The protestant Museum in the Wassy barn

1562 in France
Conflicts in 1562
Wassy
History of Haute-Marne
French Wars of Religion
Massacres of Huguenots
Massacres in 1562